Maria Sharapova was the defending champion, but withdrew because of a stomach virus. Li Na defeated Angelique Kerber for the title, 1–6, 6–3, 6–1.

Seeds
The top eight seeds and the Montreal finalists receive a bye into the second round.

Draw

Finals

Top half

Section 1

Section 2

Bottom half

Section 3

Section 4

Qualifying draw

Seeds

Qualifiers

Lucky losers

  Tímea Babos
  Anna Tatishvili

Draw

First qualifier

Second qualifier

Third qualifier

Fourth qualifier

Fifth qualifier

Sixth qualifier

Seventh qualifier

Eighth qualifier

Ninth qualifier

Tenth qualifier

Eleventh qualifier

Twelfth qualifier

References

Main Draw
Qualifying Draw

2012 WTA Tour
Women's Singles